Phlegmacium lavendulense is a species of fungus in the family Cortinariaceae.

Taxonomy 
It was described in 1928 by John Burton Cleland who classified it as Cortinarius lavendulensis.

In 1960 it was reclassified as Phlegmacium lavendulense by Meinhard Michael Moser.

In 2022 a genomic study of the family Cortinariaceae transferred many Cortinarius species to new and existing genera. The basionym Cortinarius lavendulensis was transferred to Phlegmacium and listed in the paper as a novel combination accredited to the mycologists Tuula Niskanen and Kare Liimatainen.

Habitat and distribution 
It is native to Australia and was described from a specimen collected in the Mount Lofty Ranges.

References

External links

lavendulensis
Fungi described in 1928
Fungi native to Australia
Taxa named by John Burton Cleland